('Hattie is to blame for everything!'), Op. 11, is an opera in German in three acts composed by Siegfried Wagner in 1914/15 to his own libretto. It is described as a Märchenspiel or fairy-tale play. It premiered on 6 December 1917 at the Ccourt Theatre Stuttgart.

History 

Siegfried Wagner, the son of Richard Wagner, composed several operas on fairy tale and legendary topics. He began the composition of An allem ist Hütchen schuld! in September 1914. He finished a draft for the first act on 22 September and its score in November that year, a draft for the second act on 10 January 1915 and its score on 12 April, and the draft for the third act on 11 June, completing the opera on 26 August 1915. He wrote the libretto based on several episodes from fairy-tales by the Brothers Grimm.

The premiere was at the Hoftheater Stuttgart on 6 December 1917, staged by Franz Ludwig Hörth and conducted by Erich Band. It was a success with the public comparable to his Der Bärenhäuter. The opera was performed again in Halle in 1929, staged by Heinrich Kreutz and conducted again by Band. A production in Altenburg in 1944 was also shown in Bayreuth, directed by Wieland Wagner, conducted by Kurt Overhoff and with choreography by Gertrud Wagner.

After World War II, the opera was not played. The opera was played once at the AudiMax of the Ruhr University Bochum on 18 October 2015, again staged by Pachl, with Lionel Friend conducting the Bochumer Symphoniker.

Roles

Fairy tales 
Wagner used elements from many fairy tales in his libretto, including:
 Frederick and Catherine (Der Frieder und das Katherlieschen)
 The Three Little Men in the Wood (Die drei Männlein im Walde)
 The Singing, Springing Lark (Das singende springende Löweneckerchen)
 The Clever Little Tailor (Vom klugen Schneiderlein)
 The Devil with the Three Golden Hairs (Der Teufel mit den drei goldenen Haaren)
 The Devil and his Grandmother (Der Teufel und seine Großmutter)
 The Seven Ravens (Die sieben Raben)
 Death's Messengers (Die Boten des Todes)
 Godfather Death (Der Gevatter Tod)
 The Wishing-Table, the Gold-Ass, and the Cudgel in the Sack (Tischchen deck dich, Goldesel und Knüppel aus dem Sack)
 The Little Peasant (Das Bürle)
 Allerleirauh
 The Two Kings' Children (De beiden Künigeskinner)
 The Iron Stove (Der Eisenofen)
 The True Bride (Die wahre Braut)
 Rapunzel
 The Two Brothers (Die zwei Brüder)
 Little Claus and Big Claus (Der kleine Klaus und der große Klaus) by Hans Christian Andersen

Recordings
An Allem ist Hütchen Schuld! Niklas Mix, Hans-Georg Priese, Rebecca Broberg, Alessandra di Giorgio, Maarja Purga, Karlovy Vary Symphony Orchestra, David Robert Coleman Marco Polo/Naxos 3CD 2022
An Allem ist Hütchen Schuld!, DVD Alexander Lueg, Hans-Georg Priese, Rebecca Broberg, Julia Ostertag, Bochum Symphony Orchestra, Lionel Friend, Marco Polos/Naxos DVD 2019

References

External links 
 
 
 Libretto, Siegfried Wagner Gesellschaft

Operas by Siegfried Wagner
1915 operas
German-language operas
Operas based on fairy tales
Works based on Grimms' Fairy Tales
Operas